Battle Circus are a progressive rock band from Auckland, New Zealand. The band, formed in 2004, consists of members Marcel Bellve (Vocals, Guitar), Yvonne Wu (Piano, Keyboards), Daniel Bosher (Drums) & Ryan Marshall (Bass).

Named after the 1953 Humphrey Bogart film, the band toured New Zealand constantly for several years, before setting off on international tours across Australia, Europe, and the United States (where they eventually relocated in 2010).

Battle Circus performed at many international festivals, including the Big Day Out in New Zealand, SXSW and Culture Collide in the United States, Spring Scream Festival in Taiwan, and Fuse Festival in Australia.

The band has notable relations to fellow Auckland, New Zealand band Decortica of which past member Tory Staples is now a member of. Furthermore, Daniel Bosher, a past member of Decortica and brother of their frontman Mathew Bosher, joined Battle Circus in their later years. The two bands performed and toured together for several years, becoming two of the most prominent acts amongst the area's progressive rock scene

Following the release of a series of singles, the band released their debut EP, The Half-Light Symphony. The release received local acclaim by NZ Musician and a five star review by Real Groove Magazine.

The band was the opener on Amanda Palmer's 2008 tour of the United Kingdom and Europe. Following these dates, the band embarked on their first world tour in the latter half of 2008. Previously, the band was also selected by The Red Paintings for an Australian tour, and earlier in 2007 performed at the main stage at Taiwan's infamous Spring Scream Festival.

On 27 July 2011, shortly after the release of the band's debut album, the band declared on their Facebook page that they had disbanded, though Marcel Bellve would continue to write for a different (currently unknown) project.

Discography

Albums
 Battle Circus (2011)

EPs
 The Half-Light Symphony (2007)

Videos
 Send in the Clones (2006)
 Love in a Fallout Shelter (2007)
 Utopium (2007)
 The Fantabulous Flying Machine (2011)
 Galacticus (2011)

All music by the band can be listened to or downloaded here: http://battlecircus.bandcamp.com/

External links
Official Homepage

References

New Zealand progressive rock groups